Craigie Mason Aitchison  (26 January 1882 – 2 May 1941) was a Scottish politician and judge.

Early life 
Mason was born on 16 January 1882 in Falkirk, the second son of Elizabeth Mason Craigie and Revd James Aitchison, senior minister of the Erskine United Free Church.

He was educated at Falkirk High School and the University of Edinburgh where he was the Vans Dunlop Scholar in Mental Philosophy and Muirhead Prizeman in Civil Law. He graduated with an MA in 1903 and an LLB in 1907.

Career 
Aitchison became an advocate in 1907. He was particularly effective as a defence counsel in criminal cases, and was regarded as the best advocate before a jury since Sheriff Comrie Thomson. He was noted for the Bickerstaff and John Donald Merritt cases.

He was made a King's Counsel in 1923. He worked with Sir Arthur Conan Doyle and others to secure the release of Oscar Slater, the victim one of the most notorious miscarriages of justice of the early 20th century. Aitchison who was leading Counsel at the appeal in 1929 gave a 14-hour speech.

Politics and law officer 

An unsuccessful Liberal candidate for Clackmannan and East Stirlingshire in November 1922 and December 1923, he joined the Labour Party and contested The Hartlepools at the October 1924 general election and Glasgow Central in May 1929 — where he reduced a Unionist majority of nearly 6,000 to only 627.

He was elected as Member of Parliament (MP) for Kilmarnock at a by-election in October 1929, and sat for the constituency until October 1933 as a Labour then National Labour member.

He was appointed as Lord Advocate in June 1929 serving in the Second Labour Government alongside Sir William Jowitt, the new Attorney General for England and Wales whose defeat at The Hartlepools in 1924 was attributed to Aitchison's drawing votes to the Liberals.

He was made a Privy Counsellor in 1929, and served as Lord Advocate until October 1933. He was then raised to the bench as Lord Justice Clerk, with the judicial title Lord Aitchison, at which point he automatically resigned his seat in the House of Commons, which resulted in a by-election.

Personal life 
In 1919, he married Charlotte Mary Forbes Jones (d. 1970), daughter of James Jones of Torwood Hall, Larbert. They had two sons, one of whom, John Ronald Craigie Aitchison (1926–2009) was a noted painter and a member of the Royal Academy.

Sources

References

External links 
 

1882 births
1941 deaths
Alumni of the University of Edinburgh
Members of the Parliament of the United Kingdom for Scottish constituencies
Scottish Liberal Party parliamentary candidates
Scottish Labour MPs
Lord Advocates
Members of the Privy Council of the United Kingdom
20th-century King's Counsel
Senators of the College of Justice
Scottish King's Counsel
UK MPs 1929–1931
UK MPs 1931–1935
National Labour (UK) politicians
People educated at Falkirk High School